Baruch Herzfeld (born 1972) is an American entrepreneur and the founder and president of ZenoRadio, ZenoLive and former owner of Traif Bike Geschaft.

Career

ZenoRadio

Herzfeld created a tool using conference call technology to broadcast online radio that connects immigrant communities in the United States to their homelands. Focused primarily on New York City feeder communities, this tool, he named ZenoRadio, recruited its first users who were new residents hailing from San Jose de las Matas, Dominican Republic; San Fernando, Trinidad and Tobago; and Governador Valadares, Minas Gerais, Brazil. Herzfeld set up alternative voice over IP routes in these immigrant hometowns to keep families affordably linked between their old and new lives. Today these connections extend to more than 25 countries, from China, Cambodia, Nigeria, and Congo, to Nicaragua, Haiti, Brazil, and the Dominican Republic.

Traif Bike Geschaft

Herzfeld is the former owner of Traif Bike Geschaft, a bicycle repair shop in Williamsburg, Brooklyn. He lent 500 used bicycles he had purchased from Japan to the Satmar Hasidim free of charge in an attempt to alleviate neighborhood tension between the burgeoning hipster community and the long-time Hasidic Jewish community. Herzfeld purchased  40 used mobile home trailers to store the bikes resulting in what was Brooklyn's first and only trailer park. A trailer park full of bikes and no one to ride them then inspired his personal mission to supply the local Williamsburg, Brooklyn community of Hasidic Jews with wheels to ride around the neighborhood, emerging as a cultural disruptor. Herzfeld became known as a community disruptor by local media, and dubbed a macher by Jewish media. His crowdsourcing experiments also include: a bike vending machine, a bike share program, a landlord business using a psychic to vet tenants, and an ATM that rewarded the 10th user with an extra $20 bill.

The Merengue Scandal

In 2010, prior to his incarnation as bike advocate, Herzfeld spent a year shuttling back and forth between the Dominican Republic, where he ran operations for SkyMax Dominicana (a telecom company), and Brooklyn, where SkyMax's parent company is based. Herzfeld reported to Moses Greenfield, the company's owner and a Williamsburg Satmar Hasid. In the spring of 2007, after Herzfeld clashed with his colleagues one too many times, Greenfield fired him. A dispute followed over how much money Herzfeld was owed. As per their contract, the parties took their conflict to the beth din, or rabbinical court, which functions as arbitrators. Greenfield's attorney was Nathan Lewin, an Orthodox lawyer.   The beth din ruled that Herzfeld was entitled to some of the profits he demanded. However, in Herzfeld's view, it did not go far enough in enforcing the verdict.

References 

21st-century American businesspeople
Living people
People from Staten Island
Yeshiva University alumni
Businesspeople from New York City
1972 births